The Edfu-Project is being undertaken with the primary goal of translations of inscriptions of an ancient temple of Edfu.

History

In 1986, Professor Dr. Dieter Kurth of Hamburg University initiated a long-term project that is devoted to a complete translation of the hieroglyphic inscriptions of the Temple of Edfu in Upper Egypt (Temple of Horus) that meets the requirement of both linguistics and literary studies. In addition, the research comprises all internal parallels, relevant literature and an analysis of the systematics behind the decoration. Comprehensive analytical indices – which are useful for researchers of related disciplines – and a grammar of Graeco-Roman temple inscriptions are compiled, too. Situated at the University of Hamburg, the Edfu project was financed by the "German Research Foundation" until 2001. 

Since 2002, the Academy of Sciences of Göttingen is in charge of the Edfu project, which is now financed by the "Academies' Programme". The research unit works still at Hamburg University. A translation of the inscriptions of the pylon (gate) including transcriptions and a commentary was published in 1998 (Edfou VIII). In 2004, it was followed by a translation of the inscriptions of the outer girdle wall (Edfou VII) some of which had not been published before. The most recent publication, released in 2014, provides a translation of the inscriptions of the inner side of the girdle wall (Edfou VI). Inscriptions of the open court and its columns (Chassinat, Edfou V-VI) are available in preliminary translation.

Literature 
 D. Kurth unter Mitarbeit von A. Behrmann, D. Budde, A. Effland, H. Felber, E. Pardey, S. Rüter, W. Waitkus, S. Woodhouse: Die Inschriften des Tempels von Edfu. Abteilung I Übersetzungen; Band 1. Edfou VIII, Harrassowitz Wiesbaden 1998

This volume contains the translation of the texts on the temple's pylon.

 D. Kurth unter Mitarbeit von A. Behrmann, D. Budde, A. Effland, H. Felber, J.-P. Graeff, S. Koepke, S. Martinssen-von Falck, e. Pardey, S. Rüter und W. Waitkus: Die Inschriften des Tempels von Edfu. Abteilung I Übersetzung; Band 2. Edfou VII, Harrassowitz Wiesbaden 2004

This volume contains the translation of the outer side of the girdle wall.

 D. Kurth unter Mitarbeit von A. Behrmann, A. Block, R. Brech, D. Budde, A. Effland, M. von Falck, H. Felber, J.-P. Graeff, S. Koepke, S. Martinssen-von Falck, E. Pardey, S. Rüter, W. Waitkus und S. Woodhouse: Die Inschriften des Tempels von Edfu. Abteilung I Übersetzungen; Band 3. Edfou VI, PeWe Verlag Gladbeck 2014

This volume contains the translation of the inner side of the girdle wall.

 Dieter Kurth (Hrsg.): Die Inschriften des Tempels von Edfu. Begleithefte. Harrassowitz, Wiesbaden 1991 ff. ISSN 0937-8413
 Dieter Kurth, Edfu. Ein ägyptischer Tempel, gesehen mit den Augen der Alten Ägypter, Wissenschaftliche Buchgesellschaft, Darmstadt 1994
 Dieter Kurth, Treffpunkt der Götter. Inschriften aus dem Tempel des Horus von Edfu, Artemis & Winkler Verlag, Zürich und München 1994; Düsseldorf und Zürich 1998
 Dieter Kurth, The Temple of Edfu. A Guide by an Ancient Egyptian Priest, AUC-Press, Kairo 2004

References

this reference not currently included:
page 78-79 By Dieter Arnold  Copyright Copyrighted (2003 retrieved 21/09/2011

External links 

 Homepage of the Edfu-Project - many pictures / Bilingual English translation doesn’t work
 360° Panorama pictures of the Horustemple in Edfu

Archaeological sites in Egypt
Egyptian temples